David Orbeliani, monikered David "the General" (დავით სარდალი, Davit’ Sardali) (11 January 1739 – 29 May 1796) was a Georgian military figure, politician, translator, and a poet of some talent.

A member of the prominent Georgian noble house with family ties with the Bagrationi royal dynasty, David Orbeliani was a hereditary prince of Sabaratiano, Constable of Somkhiti, and a high-ranking military commander under King Heraclius II of Georgia whose daughter, Tamar (1749-1786), married him at Tbilisi in 1762. In 1786, he ran afoul of Heraclius II, who stripped him of the office of Grand Master of the Court (sakhlt-ukhutsesi) and granted it to Ioann, Prince of Mukhrani.

David Orbeliani made several diplomatic journeys to Iran, from where he brought manuscripts of Qahraman-e qatel, a Persian prose romance of chivalry and adventure, and translated it as Qaramaniani (ყარამანიანი) which, although given some local Georgian color, follows its Persian original very closely and gained a considerable popularity in Georgia. He is also a hero of panegyrics by the contemporary Georgian poet Besiki (1750-1791), whom he responded by writing love-poetry very much in the spirit of Besiki.

Orbeliani died in Tbilisi in 1796, and was interred at Sioni Cathedral.

References 

1739 births
1796 deaths
Military personnel from Georgia (country)
Nobility of Georgia (country)
Politicians from Georgia (country)
18th-century poets from Georgia (country)
Male poets from Georgia (country)
Translators from Georgia (country)
Translators from Persian
18th-century male writers
18th-century translators